Circular Quay (foaled February 26, 2004 in Kentucky) is a thoroughbred racehorse who was a 2007 Kentucky Derby contender. The son of 1995 Belmont Stakes and Kentucky Derby winner Thunder Gulch is owned by Michael Tabor and was trained by Todd Pletcher.

Race career
Circular Quay won his maiden at Churchill Downs in June 2006, and after his subsequent victories in the Bashford Manor Stakes and the Hopeful Stakes, he was ranked on top of the Breeders' Cup Juvenile Division poll. Then came the October 7 Lane's End Breeders' Futurity, a race in which he was the heavy 2-5 favorite. With jockey Garrett Gomez in the saddle, the colt finished second, 1 lengths behind winner Great Hunter.  In the Breeders' Cup Juvenile at Churchill Downs on November 5, he finished second behind Street Sense, who won the race by 10 lengths.

In his first race as a 3-year-old in the Grade III Risen Star Stakes on February 10, 2007, at Fair Grounds Race Course, Circular Quay finished fifth after he faced traffic trouble when the horse in front of him, Slew's Tizzy, clipped heels with Makeithapencaptain and lost jockey James Graham.

The colt won the March 10 Louisiana Derby as his final prep for The May 5 Kentucky Derby, where he was one of five Pletcher entries and finished sixth after the eight-week layoff between races. Two weeks later, he was one of two entries for Pletcher in the 2007 Preakness Stakes, where he finished fifth in the field of nine.

After skipping the Belmont Stakes, Circular Quay made his first start on grass and final start as a 3-year-old and was the favorite in the Grade II Virginia Derby at Colonial Downs. However, he was not a factor and finished sixth.

2008 racing season 

Circular Quay made his 2008 debut on March 8 in the New Orleans Handicap with a win.

Stud career
The first reported foal for Circular Quay was a filly out of Destiny's Yield (by High Yield) born on January 15, 2010, at Destiny Oaks Farms in Ocala, Florida. He currently stands at the Journeyman Stud in Ocala, Florida for a fee of $6,500.

During the summer of 2014, Circular Quay was sold and now stands in Panama.

Circular Quay's descendants include:

c = colt, f = filly

Races

Pedigree

Name 
Circular Quay (pronounced "Key") is a locality of Sydney, Australia. It is the site of the first European settlement in Australia and is now a major transport hub for the city's central business district within several hundred metres of the Sydney Opera House.

References 
 Circular Quay's Pedigree and Photo
 Stats and Bio, NTRA

2004 racehorse births
Racehorses trained in the United States
Racehorses bred in Kentucky
Thoroughbred family 1-p